Super Laff-In is a Philippine sketch comedy television show that originally aired on ABS-CBN network from February 1, 1969 to September 16, 1972 and patterned after the Rowan & Martin's Laugh-In television series from the United States. The show was revived by the same network from May 25, 1996 to August 28, 1999 with an entirely new cast. The 1996 to 1999 season re-airs on the Kapamilya Channel.

Cast

First incarnation
Air date: February 1, 1969 to September 16, 1972

 Bert de Leon
 Balot
 Frankie Evangelista
 June Keithley
 Mitch Valdez (formerly Maya Valdez)
 Ramon Zamora
 Rey Javier
 Bayani Casimiro
 Tintoy
 Rose Javier
 Nova Villa
 Tange
 Babalu
 Babalina

Second incarnation
Air date: May 25, 1996, to August 28, 1999

 Redford White
 Glydel Mercado
 Wowie de Guzman
 Guila Alvarez
 Regine Tolentino
 Diether Ocampo
 Mylene Dizon
 Bayani Agbayani
 Norman Mitchell
 Vhong Navarro
 Trisha Salvador
 Bojo Molina
 Blue de Leon
 Rufa Mae Quinto
 Farrah Florera
 John Prats
 John Lloyd Cruz
 Daniel Pasia
 Dominic Ochoa
 Rommel Montano
 Miong (a cartoon character of Super Laff-in and logo)

See also
 Banana Sundae
 Bubble Gang
 Tropang Trumpo
 Wow Mali
 List of programs broadcast by ABS-CBN

References

External links
 Super Laff-In on Kapamilya Channel
 
 Youtube - Bubble Gang Tribute To Super Laff-In

ABS-CBN original programming
Philippine comedy television series
1960s Philippine television series
1970s Philippine television series
1990s Philippine television series
1969 Philippine television series debuts
1972 Philippine television series endings
1996 Philippine television series debuts
1999 Philippine television series endings
Philippine television series based on American television series
Filipino-language television shows